In the United States, internet censorship is the suppression of information published or viewed on the Internet in the United States. The First Amendment of the United States Constitution protects freedom of speech and expression against federal, state, and local government censorship.

In 2014, the United States was added to Reporters Without Borders (RWB)'s list of "Enemies of the Internet", a group of countries with the highest level of Internet censorship and surveillance. RWB stated that the U.S. has "undermined confidence in the Internet and its own standards of security" and that "U.S. surveillance practices and decryption activities are a direct threat to investigative journalists, especially those who work with sensitive sources for whom confidentiality is paramount and who are already under pressure."

In U.S. government-funded Freedom House's Freedom On the Net 2021 Report, the United States was rated the thirteenth most free of the 70 countries rated.

Overview
The strong protections for freedom of speech and expression against federal, state, and local government censorship are rooted in the First Amendment of the United States Constitution.  These protections extend to the Internet and as a result very little government mandated technical filtering occurs in the US.  Nevertheless, the Internet in the United States is highly regulated, supported by a complex set of legally binding and privately mediated mechanisms.

After more than two decades of ongoing contentious debate over content regulation, the country is still very far from reaching political consensus on the acceptable limits of free speech and the best means of protecting minors and policing illegal activity on the Internet. Gambling, cyber security, and dangers to children who frequent social networking sites are important ongoing debates. Significant public resistance to proposed content restriction policies have prevented the more extreme measures used in some other countries from taking hold in the U.S.

Public dialogue, legislative debate, and judicial review have produced filtering strategies in the United States that are different from those found in most of the rest of the world. Many government-mandated attempts to regulate content have been barred on First Amendment grounds, often after lengthy legal battles. However, the government has been able to exert pressure indirectly where it cannot directly censor. With the exception of child pornography, content restrictions tend to rely more on the removal of content than blocking; most often these controls rely upon the involvement of private parties, backed by state encouragement or the threat of legal action. In contrast to much of the rest of the world, where ISPs are subject to state mandates, most content regulation in the United States occurs at the private or voluntary level.

The first wave of regulatory actions in the 1990s in the United States came about in response to the profusion of sexually explicit material on the Internet within easy reach of minors. Since that time, several legislative attempts at creating a mandatory system of content controls in the United States have failed to produce a comprehensive solution for those pushing for tighter controls. At the same time, the legislative attempts to control the distribution of socially objectionable material on the Internet in the United States have given rise to a robust system that limits liability over content for Internet intermediaries such as Internet service providers (ISPs) and content hosting companies.

Proponents of protecting intellectual property online in the United States have been much more successful, producing a system to remove infringing materials that many feel errs on the side of inhibiting legally protected speech. The US practices forceful seizures of domains and computers, at times without notification, causing the websites to be unable to continue operating. Some high-profile cases are Napster, WikiLeaks, The Pirate Bay, and MegaUpload.

National security concerns have spurred efforts to expand surveillance of digital communications and fueled proposals for making Internet communication more traceable.

Federal laws
With a few exceptions, the free speech provisions of the First Amendment bar federal, state, and local governments from directly censoring the Internet. The primary exception has to do with obscenity, including child pornography, which does not enjoy First Amendment protection.

Computer Fraud and Abuse Act (CFAA)
The Computer Fraud and Abuse Act (CFAA) was enacted in 1986 as an amendment to an existing computer fraud law, which was part of the Comprehensive Crime Control Act of 1984. The CFAA prohibits accessing a computer without authorization, or in excess of authorization. Since 1986, the Act has been amended a number of times—in 1989, 1994, 1996, in 2001 by the USA PATRIOT Act, 2002, and in 2008 by the Identity Theft Enforcement and Restitution Act. The CFAA is both a criminal law and a statute that creates a private right of action, allowing private individuals and companies to sue to recover damages caused by violations of this law.

Provisions of the CFAA effectively make it a federal crime to violate the terms of service of Internet sites, allowing companies to forbid legitimate activities such as research, or limit or remove protections found elsewhere in law. Terms of service can be changed at any time without notifying users. Tim Wu called the CFAA "the worst law in technology".

Aggressive prosecution under the Computer Fraud and Abuse Act (CFAA) has fueled growing criticism of the law's scope and application. In 2013 a bipartisan group of lawmakers introduced legislation that would prevent the government from using CFAA to prosecute terms of service violations and stop prosecutors from bringing multiple redundant charges for a single crime. The bill was reintroduced in 2015, but did not garner enough support to move forward.

Communications Decency Act (CDA)
In 1996, the United States enacted the Communications Decency Act (CDA), which attempted to regulate both indecency (when available to children) and obscenity in cyberspace. In 1997, in the case of Reno v. ACLU, the United States Supreme Court found the anti-indecency provisions of the Act unconstitutional. Writing for the Court, Justice John Paul Stevens held that "the CDA places an unacceptably heavy burden on protected speech".

Section 230 is a separate portion of the CDA that remains in effect. Section 230 says that operators of Internet services are not legally liable for the words of third parties who use their services and also protects ISPs from liability for good faith voluntary actions taken to restrict access to certain offensive materials or giving others the technical means to restrict access to that material.

Child Online Protection Act (COPA)
In 1998, the United States enacted the Child Online Protection Act (COPA) to restrict access by minors to any material defined as harmful to such minors on the Internet. The law was found to be unconstitutional because it would hinder protected speech among adults. It never took effect, as three separate rounds of litigation led to a permanent injunction against the law in 2009. Had the law passed, it would have effectively made it an illegal act to post anything commercial based to the internet that is knowingly harmful to children without some sort of vetting program to confirm the users age.

Digital Millennium Copyright Act (DMCA)
Signed into law in 1998, the Digital Millennium Copyright Act (DMCA) criminalizes the production and dissemination of technology that could be used to circumvent copyright protection mechanisms and makes it easier to act against alleged copyright infringement on the Internet. The Online Copyright Infringement Liability Limitation Act (OCILLA) is included as Title II of the DMCA and limits the liability of the on-line service providers for copyright infringement by their users.

Children's Online Privacy Protection Act (COPPA)
The Children's Online Privacy Protection Act (COPPA) went into effect on 21 April 2000. It applies to the online collection of personal information by persons or entities under U.S. jurisdiction from children under 13 years of age and details what a website operator must include in a privacy policy, when and how to seek verifiable consent from a parent or guardian, and what responsibilities an operator has to protect children's privacy and safety online including restrictions on the marketing to those under 13. While children under 13 can legally give out personal information with their parents' permission, many websites disallow underage children from using their services altogether, due to the cost and amount of paperwork necessary for compliance.

Children's Internet Protection Act (CIPA)
In 2000 the Children's Internet Protection Act (CIPA) was signed into law.

CIPA requires K-12 schools and libraries receiving federal Universal Service Fund (E-rate) discounts or LSTA grants for Internet access or internal connections to:
 adopt and implement an Internet safety policy addressing: (a) access by minors to inappropriate matter on the Internet; (b) the safety and security of minors when using electronic mail, chat rooms, and other forms of direct electronic communications; (c) unauthorized access, including so-called "hacking," and other unlawful activities by minors online; (d) unauthorized disclosure, use, and dissemination of personal information regarding minors; and (e) measures restricting minors' access to materials harmful to them;
 install internet filters or blocking software that prevents access to pictures that are: (a) obscene, (b) child pornography, or (c) harmful to minors (for computers that are accessed by minors);
 to allow the filtering or blocking to be disabled upon the request of an adult; and
 adopt and enforce a policy to monitor the online activities of minors.
CIPA does not:
 require the tracking of Internet use by minors or adults; or
 affect E-rate funding for schools and libraries receiving discounts for telecommunications services, such as telephone service, but not for Internet access or internal connections.
 require an internet filter that prevents access to video games, social media, etc

Trading with the Enemy Act (TWEA)
In March 2008, the New York Times reported that a blocklist published by the Office of Foreign Assets Control (OFAC), an agency established under the Trading with the Enemy Act 1917 and other federal legislation, included a number of websites, so that US companies are prohibited from doing business with those websites and must freeze their assets.  The blocklist has the effect that domain name registrars based in the US must block those websites.  According to the New York Times, eNom, a private domain name registrar and Web hosting company operating in the US, disables domain names which appear on the blocklist.  It describes eNom's disabling of a European travel agent's web sites advertising travel to Cuba, which appeared on the list published by OFAC.  According to the report, the US government claimed that eNom was "legally required" to block the websites under US law, even though the websites were not hosted in the US, were not targeted at US persons and were legal under foreign law.

Cybersecurity Information Sharing Act (CISA)
The Cybersecurity Information Sharing Act (CISA) is designed to "improve cybersecurity in the United States through enhanced sharing of information about cybersecurity threats, and for other purposes". The law allows the sharing of Internet traffic information between the U.S. government and technology and manufacturing companies. The text of the bill was incorporated by amendment into a consolidated spending bill in the U.S. House on December 15, 2015, which was signed into law by President Barack Obama on December 18, 2015.

Opponents question the CISA's value, believing it will move responsibility from private business to the government, thereby increasing vulnerability of personal private information, as well as dispersing personal private information across seven government agencies, including the NSA and local police. Some felt that the act was more amenable to surveillance than actual security after many of the privacy protections from the original bill were removed.

Stop Advertising Victims of Exploitation Act of 2015 (SAVE)
The Stop Advertising Victims of Exploitation Act of 2015 (SAVE) is part of the larger Justice for Victims of Trafficking Act of 2015 which became law in May 2015. The SAVE Act makes it illegal to knowingly advertise content related to sex trafficking, including online advertising. The law establishes federal criminal liability for third-party content. There is a concern that this will lead companies to over-censor content rather than face criminal penalties, or to limit the practice of monitoring content altogether so as to avoid "knowledge" of illegal content.

Americans with Disabilities Act (ADA)
In 2016, complainants from Gallaudet University brought a lawsuit against UC Berkeley for not adding closed captioning to the recorded lectures it made free to the public. In what many commentators called an unintended consequence of the Americans with Disabilities Act of 1990, the Department of Justice ruling resulted in Berkeley deleting 20,000 of the freely licensed videos instead of making them more accessible, which Berkeley had described as being cost prohibitive.

Allow States and Victims to Fight Online Sex Trafficking Act - Stop Enabling Sex Traffickers Act (FOSTA-SESTA)

Allow States and Victims to Fight Online Sex Trafficking Act (FOSTA) is a bill introduced in the U.S. House of Representative by Ann Wagner in April 2017. Stop Enabling Sex Traffickers Act (SESTA) is a similar U.S. Senate bill introduced by Rob Portman in August 2017. The combined FOSTA-SESTA package passed the House on February 27, 2018 with a vote of 388-25 and the Senate on March 21, 2018 with a vote of 97–2. The bill was signed into law by Donald Trump on April 11, 2018.

The bill amended Section 230 of the Communications Decency Act to exclude the enforcement of federal and state sex trafficking laws from immunity, and clarified the Stop Advertising Victims of Exploitation Act to define participation in a venture as knowingly assisting, facilitating, or supporting sex trafficking.

The bills were criticized by pro-free speech and pro-Internet groups as a "disguised internet censorship bill" that weakens the section 230 safe harbors, places unnecessary burdens on internet companies and intermediaries that handle user-generated content or communications with service providers required to proactively take action against sex trafficking activities, and requiring a "team of lawyers" to evaluate all possible scenarios under state and federal law (which may be financially unfeasible for smaller companies).  Online sex workers argued that the bill would harm their safety, as the platforms they utilize for offering and discussing sexual services (as an alternative to street prostitution) had begun to reduce their services or shut down entirely due to the threat of liability under the bill.

Proposed federal legislation that has not become law

Deleting Online Predators Act (DOPA)
The Deleting Online Predators Act of 2006 was introduced, but did not become law. Two similar bills were introduced in 2007, but neither became law.

The proposed legislation would have required schools, some businesses, and libraries to block minors' access to social networking websites. The bill was controversial because, according to its critics, it would limit access to a wide range of websites, including many with harmless and educational material.

Protecting Cyberspace as a National Asset Act (PCNAA) 
The Protecting Cyberspace as a National Asset Act was introduced in 2010, but did not become law.

The proposed Act caused controversy for what critics perceived as its authorization for the U.S. president to apply a full block of the Internet in the U.S.

A new bill, the Executive Cyberspace Coordination Act of 2011, was under consideration by the U.S. Congress in 2011. The new bill addresses many of the same issues as, but takes quite a different approach from the Protecting Cyberspace as a National Asset Act.

Combating Online Infringement and Counterfeits Act (COICA)
The Combating Online Infringement and Counterfeits Act was introduced in September 2010, but did not become law.

The proposed Act would have allowed the U.S. Attorney General to bring an in rem action against an infringing domain name in United States District Court, and seek an order requesting injunctive relief. If granted, such an order would compel the registrar of the domain name in question to suspend operation of, and may lock, the domain name.

The U.S. Justice Department would maintain two publicly available lists of domain names. The first list would contain domain names against which the Attorney General has obtained injunctions. The second list would contain domains alleged by the Justice Department to be infringing, but against which no action had been taken. Any service provider who willingly took steps to block access to sites on this second list would immune from prosecution under the bill.

Stop Online Piracy Act (SOPA)
The Stop Online Piracy Act (SOPA), also known as H.R. 3261, is a bill that was introduced in the United States House of Representatives on October 26, 2011, by Representative Lamar Smith (R-TX) and a bipartisan group of 12 initial co-sponsors. The originally proposed bill would allow the U.S. Department of Justice, as well as copyright holders, to seek court orders against websites accused of enabling or facilitating copyright infringement. Depending on who requests the court orders, the actions could include barring online advertising networks and payment facilitators such as PayPal from doing business with the allegedly infringing website, barring search engines from linking to such sites, and requiring Internet service providers to block access to such sites. Many have argued that since ISP's would be required to block access to certain websites that this is censorship. On  January 18, 2012, the English Wikipedia shut down for 24 hours beginning at 5:00 UTC (12:00 EST) to protest SOPA and PIPA. In the wake of this and many other online protests, Rep. Smith stated, "The House Judiciary Committee will postpone consideration of the legislation until there is wider agreement on a solution".

Senator Ron Wyden, an Oregon Democrat and a key opponent of the bills, said lawmakers had collected more than 14 million names — more than 10 million of them voters — who contacted them to protest the once-obscure legislation.

Protect Intellectual Property Act (PIPA)
The Protect Intellectual Property Act (Preventing Real Online Threats to Economic Creativity and Theft of Intellectual Property Act, or PIPA) was a proposed law with the stated goal of giving the US government and copyright holders additional tools to curb access to "rogue websites dedicated to infringing or counterfeit goods", especially those registered outside the U.S. The bill was introduced on May 12, 2011, by Senator Patrick Leahy (D-VT) and 11 bipartisan co-sponsors. PIPA is a re-write of the Combating Online Infringement and Counterfeits Act (COICA), which failed to pass in 2010. In the wake of online protests held on January 18, 2012, Senate Majority Leader Harry Reid announced on Friday January 20 that a vote on the bill would be postponed until issues raised about the bill were resolved. Reid urged Leahy, the chief sponsor of PIPA, to "continue engaging with all stakeholders to forge a balance between protecting Americans' intellectual property, and maintaining openness and innovation on the internet."

Cyber Intelligence Sharing and Protection Act (CISPA)

The Cyber Intelligence Sharing and Protection Act (CISPA) was a proposed law introduced in November 2011, with the stated goal of giving the U.S. government additional options and resources to ensure the security of networks against attacks. It was passed by the U.S. House of Representatives in April 2012, but was not passed by the U.S. Senate. The bill was reintroduced in the House in February 2013 and again in January 2015. While this bill never became law, a similar bill from the U.S. Senate, the Cybersecurity Information Sharing Act (CISA), was incorporated by amendment into a consolidated spending bill in the U.S. House on December 15, 2015, and was signed into law by President Barack Obama on December 18, 2015.

CISPA was supported by several trade groups containing more than eight hundred private companies, including the Business Software Alliance, CTIA – The Wireless Association, Information Technology Industry Council, Internet Security Alliance, National Cable & Telecommunications Association, National Defense Industrial Association, TechAmerica and United States Chamber of Commerce, in addition to individual major telecommunications and information technology companies like AT&T, Facebook, IBM, Intel, Oracle Corporation, Symantec, and Verizon.

Reporters Without Borders expressed concern that in the name of the war on cyber crime, it would allow the government and private companies to deploy draconian measures to monitor, even censor, the Web. Other organizations that oppose the bill include the Constitution Project, American Civil Liberties Union, Electronic Frontier Foundation, Center for Democracy and Technology, Fight for the Future, Free Press, Sunlight Foundation, and TechFreedom. Google did not take a public position on the bill, but lobbied for it.

State laws
In November 2016 the National Conference of State Legislatures listed twenty-seven states with laws that apply to Internet use at publicly funded schools or libraries:
The majority of these states simply require school boards/districts or public libraries to adopt Internet use policies to prevent minors from gaining access to sexually explicit, obscene or harmful materials. However, some states also require publicly funded institutions to install filtering software on library terminals or school computers.

The states that require schools and/or libraries to adopt policies to protect minors include: California, Delaware, Georgia, Indiana, Iowa, Kentucky, Louisiana, Maryland, Massachusetts, New Hampshire, New York, Rhode Island, South Carolina, and Tennessee. Florida law "encourages public libraries to adopt an Internet safety education program, including the implementation of a computer-based educational program."

The states that require Internet filtering in schools and/or libraries to protect minors are: Arizona, Arkansas, Colorado, Idaho, Kansas, Michigan, Minnesota, Missouri, Ohio, Pennsylvania, South Dakota, Utah, and Virginia.

And five states require Internet service providers to make a product or service available to subscribers to control use of the Internet. They are: Louisiana, Maryland, Nevada, Texas, and Utah.

In July 2011 Missouri lawmakers passed the Amy Hestir Student Protection Act which included a provision that barred K-12 teachers from using websites that allow "exclusive access" in communications with current students or former students who are 18 or younger, such as occurs with private messages on sites such as Facebook. A circuit court order issued before the law went into effect blocked the provision because "the breadth of the prohibition is staggering" and the law "would have a chilling effect" on free-speech rights guaranteed under the US Constitution. In September the legislature replaced the controversial provision with a requirement that local school districts develop their own policies on the use of electronic communication between employees and students.

In December 2016, Bill Chumley, member of the South Carolina House of Representatives, introduced a bill that would require all computers to be sold with "digital blocking capabilities" to restrict access to pornographic materials. Users or manufacturers would be required to pay a $20 fee in order to lift the blocks. As of April 2018 the bill had not become law, but remained pending before the House Committee on Judiciary.

In March 2018, Frank Ciccone and Hanna Gallo, members of the Rhode Island State Senate, introduced a bill requiring Internet Service Providers to institute a block on pornographic materials, which could be lifted with the payment of a $20 fee.

Court rulings 
In April 2022, District Judge Katherine Polk Failla issued a site blocking order against three piracy websites, which were cited in lawsuits brought upon by a group of Israeli media companies, but whose operators failed to appear in court. The order mandates that the three websites, as well as any "newly-discovered websites" that are found to be operated by the defendants, be blocked by all U.S. ISPs. It also prohibits any third-party service operator from doing business with or offering services to the defendants, and orders that their domain names be seized and transferred to the plaintiffs. This order is similar to, but goes beyond what was proposed in SOPA.

Censorship by institutions

The constitutional and other legal protections that prohibit or limit government censorship of the Internet do not generally apply to private corporations. Corporations may voluntarily choose to limit the content they make available or allow others to make available on the Internet. Corporations may be encouraged by government pressure or required by law or court order to remove or limit Internet access to content that is judged to be obscene (including child pornography), harmful to children, defamatory, pose a threat to national security, promote illegal activities such as gambling, prostitution, theft of intellectual property, hate speech, and inciting violence.

Public and private institutions that provide Internet access for their employees, customers, students, or members will sometimes limit this access in an attempt to ensure it is used only for the purposes of the organization. This can include content-control software to limit access to entertainment content in business and educational settings and limiting high-bandwidth services in settings where bandwidth is at a premium. Some institutions also block outside e-mail services as a precaution, usually initiated out of concerns for local network security or concerns that e-mail might be used intentionally or unintentionally to allow trade secrets or other confidential information to escape.

Schools and libraries
K-12 schools and libraries that accept funds from the federal E-rate program or Library Services and Technology Act grants for Internet access or internal connections are required by Children's Internet Protection Act to have an "Internet safety policy and technology protection measures in place".

Many K-12 school districts in the United States use Internet filters to block material deemed inappropriate for the school setting. The federal government leaves decisions about what to filter or block to local authorities. However, many question this approach, feeling that such decisions should be made by a student's parents or guardian. Some of the fears associated with Internet filtering in schools include: the risk of supporting a predominant ideology, that views held by filter manufacturers are being imposed on students, over blocking of useful information, and under blocking of harmful information. A 2003 study "found that blocking software overblocked state-mandated curriculum topics extensively–for every web page correctly blocked as advertised, one or more was blocked incorrectly."

Some libraries may also block access to certain web pages, including pornography, advertising, chat, gaming, social networking, and online forum sites, but there is a long and important tradition among librarians against censorship and the use of filtering and blocking software in libraries remains very controversial.

Search engines and social media

In 2007, Verizon attempted to block the abortion rights group NARAL Pro-Choice America from using their text messaging services to speak to their supporters. Verizon claims it was in order to enforce a policy that doesn't allow their customers to use their service to communicate "controversial" or "unsavory" messages. Comcast, AT&T and many other ISPs have also been accused of regulating internet traffic and bandwidth.

eNom, a private domain name registrar and Web hosting company operating in the U.S., disables domain names which appear on a U.S. Treasury Department blocklist.

Military
The Department of Defense prohibits its personnel from accessing certain IP addresses from DoD computers. The US military's filtering policy is laid out in a report to Congress entitled "Department of Defense Personnel Access to the Internet".

In October 2009, military blogger C.J. Grisham was temporarily pressured by his superiors at Redstone Arsenal to close his blog, A Soldier's Perspective, after complaining about local public school officials pushing a mandatory school uniform program without parental consent.

The Monterey Herald reported on June 27, 2013 that the United States Army bars its personnel from accessing parts of The Guardian website after whistleblower Edward Snowden's revelations about the PRISM global surveillance program and the National Security Agency (NSA) were published there. The entire Guardian website is blocked for personnel stationed throughout Afghanistan, the Middle East, and South Asia, as well as personnel stationed at U.S. Central Command headquarters in Florida.

WikiLeaks

In February 2008, the Bank Julius Baer vs. WikiLeaks lawsuit prompted the United States District Court for the Northern District of California to issue a permanent injunction against the website WikiLeaks' domain name registrar. The result was that WikiLeaks could not be accessed through its web address. This elicited accusations of censorship and resulted in the Electronic Frontier Foundation stepping up to defend WikiLeaks. After a later hearing, the injunction was lifted.

On December 1, 2010 Amazon.com cut off WikiLeaks 24 hours after being contacted by the staff of Joe Lieberman, Chairman of the U.S. Senate Committee on Homeland Security. In a statement Lieberman said:
[Amazon's] decision to cut off WikiLeaks now is the right decision and should set the standard for other companies WikiLeaks is using to distribute its illegally seized material. I call on any other company or organization that is hosting WikiLeaks to immediately terminate its relationship with them.
Constitutional lawyers say that this is not a first amendment issue because Amazon, as a private company, is free to make its own decisions. Kevin Bankston, a lawyer with the Electronic Frontier Foundation, agreed that this is not a violation of the first amendment, but said it was nevertheless disappointing.

Individual websites
Some websites that allow user-contributed content practice self-censorship by adopting policies on how the web site may be used and by banning or requiring pre-approval of editorial contributions from users that do not follow the policies for the site. For example, social media websites may restrict hate speech to a larger degree than is required by US law, and may restrict harassment and verbal abuse.

Restriction of hate speech and harassment on social media is the subject of debate in the US. For example, two perspectives include that online hate speech should be removed because it causes serious intimidation and harm, and that it shouldn't be removed because it's "better to know that there are bigots among us" than to have an inaccurate picture of the world.

By corporations abroad

Several U.S. corporations including Google, Yahoo!, Microsoft, and MySpace practice greater levels of self-censorship in some international versions of their online services. This is most notably the case in these corporations' dealings in China.

In October 2011 US-based Blue Coat Systems of Sunnyvale, California acknowledged that Syria is using  its devices to censor Web activity, a possible violation of US trade embargoes.

Intellectual property

A January 4, 2007 restraining order issued by U.S. District Court Judge Jack B. Weinstein forbade a large number of activists in the psychiatric survivors movement from posting links on their websites to ostensibly leaked documents which purportedly show that Eli Lilly and Company intentionally withheld information as to the lethal side-effects of Zyprexa. The Electronic Frontier Foundation appealed this as prior restraint on the right to link to and post documents, saying that citizen-journalists should have the same First Amendment rights as major media outlets. It was later held that the judgment was unenforceable, though First Amendment claims were rejected.

In May 2011 and January 2012 the US seized the domains of the non-US websites of the non-US citizens Richard O'Dwyer and Kim Dotcom, and sought to extradite them to the US, accusing them of copyright infringement.

In January 2015 details from the Sony Pictures Entertainment hack revealed the Motion Picture Association of America's lobbying of the United States International Trade Commission to mandate that US ISPs either at the internet transit or internet service provider level, implement IP address blocking of unauthorized file sharing as well as linking websites.

Bay Area Rapid Transit (BART) cell phone service suspension
On July 3, 2011, two officers of the Bay Area Rapid Transit (BART) Police shot and killed Charles Hill at Civic Center Station in San Francisco. On August 12, 2011, BART shut down cell phone services, including mobile Internet access, for three hours in an effort to limit possible protests against the shooting and to keep communications away from protesters at the Civic Center station in San Francisco. The shutdown caught the attention of international media, as well as drawing comparisons to the former Egyptian president Hosni Mubarak in several articles and comments.

On August 29, 2011, a coalition of nine public interest groups led by Public Knowledge filed an Emergency Petition asking the U.S. Federal Communications Commission (FCC) to declare "that the actions taken by the Bay Area Rapid Transit District ("BART") on August 11, 2011 violated the Communications Act of 1934,
as amended, when it deliberately interfered with access to Commercial Mobile Radio Service
("CMRS") by the public" and "that local law enforcement has no authority to suspend or deny CMRS, or to order CMRS providers to suspend or deny service, absent a properly obtained order from the Commission, a state commission of appropriate jurisdiction, or a court of law with appropriate jurisdiction".

In December 2011 BART adopted a new "Cell Service Interruption Policy" that only allows shutdowns of cell phone services within BART facilities "in the most extraordinary circumstances that threaten the safety of District passengers, employees and other members of public, the destruction of District property, or the substantial
disruption of public transit service." According to a spokesperson for BART, under the new policy the wireless phone system would not be turned off under circumstances similar to those in August 2011. Instead police officers would arrest individuals who break the law.

Interruption of communication services
In March 2012 the FCC requested public comment on the question of whether or when the police and other government officials can intentionally interrupt cellphone and Internet service to protect public safety. In response, through the end of May 2012, the FCC received 137 comments and 9 reply comments. As of July 2013 the proceeding remained open, but the FCC had taken no further action.

In December 2014 the FCC issued an Enforcement Advisory that warns the public "that it is illegal to use a cell phone jammer or any other type of device that blocks, jams or interferes with authorized communications" and that "this prohibition extends to every entity that does not hold a federal authorization, including state and local law enforcement agencies". While jamming was not used by BART to disable cell phones, the legal and regulatory considerations are similar.

In December 2016 the California Law Revision Commission issued a recommendation on "Government Interruption of Communication Service". The Commission concluded that government action to interrupt communications can be constitutional in some circumstances, if the government acts
pursuant to procedures that are properly designed to protect constitutional free expression and due process rights. To be constitutional the action will usually need to be approved by a judicial officer who has found (i) probable cause that the communication service is or will be used for an unlawful purpose, (ii) that immediate action is required to protect public health, safety, or welfare and (iii) the affected customer must have a prompt opportunity for adjudication of the government's contentions. For a general interruption of communication service that will affect a large number of people or a large geographic area, judicial approval would also require that the action (iv) is necessary to avoid a serious threat of violence that is both imminent and likely to occur or (v) that the effect on expression is incidental to some other valid government purpose, and (vi) is reasonable, (vii) is content-neutral, (viii) would impair no more speech than is necessary, and (ix) leaves open other ample means of communication. Prior judicial approval is not required in extreme emergencies involving immediate danger of death or great bodily injury where there is insufficient time to obtain a court order.

Beyond constitutional law, a state or local government's ability to effect a general interruption of wireless communication service is also subject to the federal "Emergency Wireless Protocol (EWP)" or "Standard Operating Procedure 303" which established a process for interrupting and restoring wireless communication service during times of national emergency.The effect of this protocol is that state and local government officials can initiate an interruption of communication service, but they cannot directly order wireless communication service providers to take action. Such orders to private wireless communication providers must come from the National Coordinating Center for Communications (NCC) within the Department of Homeland Security (DHS), the federal officials designated by the EWP. If an order authorizing an interruption does not fall within the EWP, it is served directly on the relevant communication service provider.

See also
 Internet censorship and surveillance by country
 Communications Assistance for Law Enforcement Act (CALEA)
 Mass surveillance in the United States

References
 This article incorporates licensed material from the Regional Overviews and other sections of the OpenNet Initiative web site.

External links

 Global Integrity: Internet Censorship, A Comparative Study; puts US online censorship in cross-country context.

 
United States
United States